Muhammad Fayadh bin Mohd Zulkifli Amin (born 14 September 1998) is a Malaysian professional footballer who plays as a winger for Malaysia Super League club Kedah Darul Aman.

Career statistics

Club

Honours
Kedah Darul Aman
 Malaysia FA Cup: 2019
 Malaysia Cup runner-up: 2019
 Malaysia Super League runner-up: 2020, 2021

References

External links
 

1998 births
Living people
People from Kedah
Malaysian footballers
Association football midfielders
Kedah Darul Aman F.C. players
Malaysia Super League players